Sheppard is an unincorporated community located in the town of Brockway, Jackson County, Wisconsin, United States.

History
The community was named for Andrew Sheppard, the owner of a local sawmill.

Notes

Unincorporated communities in Jackson County, Wisconsin
Unincorporated communities in Wisconsin